North Presbyterian Church may refer to:

 Presbyterian Church in the United States of America, also known as the "Northern Presbyterian Church"

 North Presbyterian Church (Iowa City, Iowa), listed on the National Register of Historic Places (NRHP)
Franklin Avenue Presbyterian Church, Lansing, Michigan, NRHP-listed, also known as "North Presbyterian Church"
 North Presbyterian Church (Omaha, Nebraska), NRHP-listed
Hellenic Orthodox Church of the Annunciation, Buffalo, New York, also known as "North Presbyterian Church", NRHP-listed in Erie County
 North Presbyterian Church (Manhattan), a New York City congregation and one extant and two demolished churches belonging to it
North Presbyterian Church, a defunct 19th-century congregation in Greenwich Village, New York City
 North Presbyterian Church (Cleveland, Ohio), NRHP-listed